Murcian can refer to:
Murcian Spanish

Places of origin
 Someone or something from the Region of Murcia: a single-province autonomous community in Spain
 Someone or something from Murcia, Murcia, Spain: the capital of the Region of Murcia
 Someone or something from Murcia, Negros Occidental: a city in the Philippines
 Someone or something from Murcia, Costa Rica: a city in the Region of Cartago, Costa Rica
 Someone or something from Murcia, Bolivia: a city in the Pando Department, Bolivia

Livestock Breeds
 Murciana goat, a dairy goat from the Region of Murcia in Spain

Mythology
 Of or pertaining to Murcia or Murtia: a mythical goddess later merged in meaning with Venus (mythology)